Bon Zard-e Sofla (also Romanized as Bon Zard-e Soflá and Bon Zard Soflá; also known as Bon Zard and Bon Zard-e Pā’īn) is a village in Pataveh Rural District, Pataveh District, Dana County, Kohgiluyeh and Boyer-Ahmad Province, Iran. At the 2006 census, its population was 883, in 192 families.

References 

Populated places in Dana County